The 2013–14 UC Irvine Anteaters men's basketball team represented the University of California, Irvine during the 2013–14 NCAA Division I men's basketball season. The Anteaters were led by fourth year head coach Russell Turner and played their home games at the Bren Events Center. They were members of the Big West Conference. They finished the season 23–12, 13–3 in Big West play to win the Big West regular season championship. They advanced to the Big West Conference tournament where they lost to Cal Poly. As a regular season conference champion who failed to win their conference tournament they earned an automatic bid to the National Invitation Tournament where they lost in the first round to SMU.

Off-Season

2013 Recruiting Class

Roster

Schedule
Source

|-
!colspan=9 style="background:#002244; color:#FFDE6C;"|  Exhibition

|-
!colspan=9 style="background:#002244; color:#FFDE6C;"| Regular season

|-
!colspan=9 style="background:#002244; color:#FFDE6C;"| Big West tournament

|-
!colspan=9 style="background:#002244; color:#FFDE6C;"| NIT

References

UC Irvine Anteaters men's basketball seasons
UC Irvine
UC Irvine
UC Irvine Anteaters
UC Irvine Anteaters